Chili (Cheye-leye) is an unincorporated community in Richland Township, Miami County, in the U.S. state of Indiana.

History
Chili, originally called New Market, was surveyed in 1839. In 1886, the Peru and Detroit Railway was extended to Chili.

A post office was established at Chili in 1843, and remained in operation until it was discontinued in 1961.

Geography
Chili is located on the north bank of the Eel River.

References

Unincorporated communities in Miami County, Indiana
Unincorporated communities in Indiana